Grossbach or Großbach may refer to:

Großbach (Ruwer), a river of  Rhineland-Palatinate, Germany, tributary of the Ruwer
Großbach (Nahe), a river of  Rhineland-Palatinate, Germany, tributary of the Nahe